National Route 22 is a national highway in South Korea connects Jeongeup to Suncheon. It established on 31 August 1971.

Main stopovers
North Jeolla Province
 Jeongeup - Gochang County
South Jeolla Province
 Yeonggwang County - Hampyeong County
Gwangju
 Gwangsan District - Seo District - Nam District - Dong District
South Jeolla Province
 Hwasun County - Suncheon

Major intersections

 (■): Motorway
IS: Intersection, IC: Interchange

North Jeolla Province

South Jeolla Province (North Gwangju)

Gwangju

South Jeolla Province (South Gwangju)

References

22
Roads in South Jeolla
Roads in North Jeolla
Roads in Gwangju